Azerbaijan competed at the 2016 Summer Paralympics in Rio de Janeiro, Brazil, from 7 to 18 September 2016.

Medalists

Delegation 
The country sent a team of 25 athletes, 20 men and 5 women, along with 2 officials to the 2016 Summer Paralympics.

Competitors

Archery

Women

|-
|align=left|Zinyat Valiyeva
|align=left rowspan=2|Individual recurve open
|472
|31
|align="center"|  L 0-6
|colspan=4|Did not advance
|17
|}

Athletics (track and field) 

Men's Track

Men's Field

Women's

Javelin Throw

Track events

Key
Note–Ranks given for track events are within the athlete's heat only
DSQ = Disqualified
DNS = Did not start
DNF = Did not finish
Q = Qualified for the next round
q = Qualified for the next round as a fastest loser
WR = World record
PR = Paralympic record
RR = Regional record
NR = National record
N/A = Round not applicable for the event
Bye = Athlete not required to compete in round

Judo 

With one pathway for qualification being having a top finish at the 2014 IBSA Judo World Championships, Azerbaijan earned a qualifying spot in Rio base on the performance of Bayram Mustafayev in the men's -66 kg event.  The B3 Judoka finished first in his class. Ramil Gasimov gave his country a second spot after the B2 judoka won the men's -73kg class.

Men

Women

Powerlifting

Shooting

Swimming

Men

See also
Azerbaijan at the 2016 Summer Olympics

References

Nations at the 2016 Summer Paralympics
2016
2016 in Azerbaijani sport